The French Guiana Zoo (French: Zoo de Guyane) is a zoo in French Guiana, France. It is located between Macouria and Montsinéry. The zoo opened in 1983 as a hummingbird centre and was called Fauna Flora Amazonica. The zoo closed in 2007, however it was bought, and reopened in 2008. It is open Wednesday to Sunday.

Overview
In 1983 Rudolf Watshinger started a hummingbird breeding centre, and called it Fauna Flora Amazonica. In 1985, the centre was turned into a zoo. In 2002, it was bought by the communes Macouria and Montsinéry-Tonnegrande, and in 2007, the zoo closed.

In 2014, an aviary with 40 parrots and other birds was built near the entrance, and named after Eugène Bellony who opened the first animal park of French Guiana in the 1930s. In 2013, the zoo was the second most visited attraction in French Guiana after the Salvation Islands.

The collection of the zoo includes several species of monkeys, sloths, anteaters, harpy eagles, caimans, and a large collection of birds. There is a treetop path through the canopy for the children. The French Guiana Zoo is a member of the European Association of Zoos and Aquaria.

Gallery

References

External links
 Official site (in French and English)

Macouria
Tourist attractions in French Guiana
Zoos established in 1983
Zoos in French Guiana